Whisler, Pinchgut, Whistler, or Wissler is an unincorporated community in Pickaway County, in the U.S. state of Ohio.

History
A post office called Whisler was established in 1883, and remained in operation until 1933.  Besides the post office, Whisler had a country store.

References

Unincorporated communities in Pickaway County, Ohio
Unincorporated communities in Ohio